Fred or Frederick Graham may refer to:
 Fred Graham (actor) (1908–1979), American actor and stuntman
 Fred Graham (American football) (1900–1952), American professional football player
 Fred Graham (correspondent) (1931–2019), American lawyer, chief anchor, and managing editor of Court TV
 Fred Graham (sculptor) (born 1928), New Zealand artist and educator
 Fred Graham (politician) (1899–1996), Australian politician, member of the Queensland Legislative Assembly
 Frederick Graham (British Army officer) (1908–1988)
 Sir Frederick Graham, 3rd Baronet, British diplomat
 Fergus Graham (Frederick Fergus Graham, 1893–1978), British politician